"Politics, Religion and Her" is a song written by Byron Hill and Tony Martin, and recorded by American country music artist Sammy Kershaw.  It was released in November 1996 as the third single and title track from the album Politics, Religion and Her.  The song peaked at #28 on the Billboard Hot Country Singles & Tracks chart.

Chart performance

References

1996 singles
1996 songs
Sammy Kershaw songs
Songs written by Byron Hill
Songs written by Tony Martin (songwriter)
Song recordings produced by Keith Stegall
Mercury Records singles